Burke "BT" Toews (born February 8, 1966) is a Canadian basketball coach and former player. He is the head coach of the Fujitsu Red Wave in the Japanese Women's Japan Basketball League. Toews played professionally in Canada and Germany. His son Kai Toews is a professional basketball player, and his nephew Jonathan Toews is a professional hockey player as captain of the Chicago Blackhawks of the NHL.

Head coaching record

|-
| style="text-align:left;"|Hyogo Storks
| style="text-align:left;"|2011-12
| 27||17||10|||| style="text-align:center;"|4th|||2||1||1||
| style="text-align:center;"|3rd
 
|-
|- style="background:#FDE910;"
| style="text-align:left;"|Hyogo Storks
| style="text-align:left;"|2012-13
| 32||27||5|||| style="text-align:center;"|1st in Western|||2||2||0||
| style="text-align:center;"|JBL2 Champions
 
|-
| style="text-align:left;"|Fujitsu Red Wave
| style="text-align:left;"|2014-15
| 30||24||6|||| style="text-align:center;"|3rd|||5||2||3||
| style="text-align:center;"|Runners-up
 
|-
| style="text-align:left;"|Fujitsu Red Wave
| style="text-align:left;"|2015-16
| 24||18||6|||| style="text-align:center;"|2nd|||10||5||5||
| style="text-align:center;"|Runners-up
 
|-
| style="text-align:left;"|Hitachi SunRockers Tokyo-Shibuya
| style="text-align:left;"|2016-17
| 60||32||28|||| style="text-align:center;"|3rd in Central|||2||0||2||
| style="text-align:center;"|Lost in 1st round
 
|-

References

1966 births
Living people
Basketball players from Winnipeg
Canadian expatriate sportspeople in Japan
Canadian men's basketball players
Nishinomiya Storks coaches
Sun Rockers Shibuya coaches
Toyama Grouses coaches
Winnipeg Wesmen basketball players